Marek Jankulovski (born 9 May 1977) is a Czech former professional footballer who played as a defender. His most notable achievements include winning the UEFA Champions League with AC Milan and being voted the 2007 Czech Footballer of the Year. He earned 77 caps for the Czech Republic, and represented them at three UEFA European Championships, the 2000 Summer Olympics and the 2006 FIFA World Cup.

A quick, tenacious, and hardworking player, Jankulovski was well known for his versatility, being able to play anywhere on the left side, and was used as a full-back, as a wing-back, and as a winger throughout his career. He was also known for his ability to cross the ball, as well as his considerable technical ability and energetic attacking runs down the left flank.

Club career

Baník Ostrava
Jankulovski started his career for Baník Ostrava after joining from NH Ostrava. In 1994, he made a breakthrough into the first team, as the club finished in third place in the league. Jankulovski started out, playing in the attacking midfield position before playing in the defender position and established himself in the first team.

At the start of 1999–2000 season, Jankulovski started the season well when he scored two goals against Chmel Blšany and Sigma Olomouc. It wasn't until on 27 February 2000 when Jankulovski scored his third goal of the season, in a 4–1 win against Sigma Olomouc. This was followed by scoring twice. In a 3–1 win against Drnovice. He then went on to score three goals later in the 1999–2000 season. At the end of the 1999–2000 season, Jankulovski went on to make 27 appearances and scoring eight times in all competitions; his performance at Baník Ostrava attracted interest from foreign clubs. By the time he departed from the club, Jankulovski made a total of 110 league appearances and scoring fifteen times throughout his time at Baník Ostrava.

Napoli
Following his participation in the UEFA Euro 2000, Napoli began negotiations of signing Jankulovski. The move was confirmed the next day and he was given a number fifteen shirt. It was revealed that his compatriot Zdeněk Zeman recommended the player to join the club. Jankulovski said about his compatriot manager, Zeman: "I had heard of Zeman's methods in my country. I had prepared myself to suffer. Yet I am still in pieces, after having faced many kilometers of running in a few days. It is a different preparation from what I was used to."

Having started out on the substitute bench for the first three league matches, he made his debut for Napoli, starting the whole game, in a 1–1 draw against Lecce on 1 November 2000. This was followed up by scoring his first goal for the club, in a 2–1 loss against Vicenza. After the match, la Repubblica praised his performance. Since joining Napoli, however, Jankulovski found his playing time, mostly coming from the substitute bench. He then scored his second goal for the club, after coming on as a 75th-minute substitute, in a 6–2 win against Reggina on 16 December 2000. However, Jankulovski received a straight red card in the 89th minute, having come on as a 70th-minute substitute, in a 0–0 draw against Perugia on 18 March 2001. After serving a one match suspension, he scored on his return, having come on as an 83rd-minute substitute, against Bari on 14 April 2001. However, Jankulovski was unable to help the club avoid relegation to Serie B. At the end of the 2000–01 season, he went on to make twenty appearances and scoring once in all competitions.

Ahead of the 2001–02 season, it was expected that Jankulovski would be staying at Napoli despite the club's relegation. He scored his first goal of the season, in a 2–1 loss against Siena on 12 August 2001. After the start of the 2001–02 season, Jankulovski continued to regain his first-team place, rotating in playing either left midfield and central midfield. By December, he began playing at left-back. Jankulovski then scored two goals in the next two matches against Cosenza and Pistoiese between 9 December 2001 and 14 December 2001. After missing two missing two matches through injury, he scored his return, in a 1–1 draw against Cagliari on 24 February 2002. Jankulovski then scored two more goals later in the 2001–02 season against Palermo and Siena. Despite suffering injuries throughout 2001–02 season, he went on to make 33 appearances in all competitions, scoring six times.

Udinese
On 1 February 2002, Jankulovski joined Udinese in a transfer worth €3.5 million, and was loaned back to Napoli. He was previously linked with a move to Premier League side West Ham United.

Jankulovski made his debut for the club, coming on as a 58th-minute substitute, in a 1–1 draw against Parma in the opening game of the season. Since joining Udinese, he quickly became a first-team regular, rotating in playing either at left-back or in midfield for the next five matches. After missing five matches that saw him sidelined for a month, Jankulovski returned to the first team, coming on as a 66th-minute substitute, in a 2–1 win against Empoli on 8 December 2002. He then helped Udinese keep three consecutive clean sheets between 18 December 2002 and 12 January 2003. Despite being sidelined towards the end of the 2002–03 season, Jankulovski continued to regain his first-team place, rotating in playing either left-back or in midfield. He scored his first goal for the club, in a 3–2 loss against Parma on 2 February 2003. This was followed by scoring his second goal of the season, in a 2–1 win against Piacenza. Jankulovski scored his third goal of the season, in a 3–2 win against Como on 19 April 2003. He, once again, scored two goals in two matches in the remaining two matches of the 2002–03 season against Perugia and Lazio. At the end of the 2002–03 season, Jankulovski made 29 appearances and scored five times in all competitions.

Ahead of the 2003–04 season, Jankulovski's performances attracted interests from clubs at Serie A but he ended up staying at Udinese. The start of the 2003–04 season saw Jankulovski continue to regain his first-team place, rotating in playing either left-back or in midfield in the first 12 matches of the season. He played in both legs of the UEFA Cup's first round against Austria Salzburg, as the club lost 3–2 on aggregate. Jankulovski then scored his first goal of the season, in a 4–1 loss against Juventus on 9 November 2003. A month later, he scored in both legs of the Coppa Italia last 16 against Bologna, as Udinese won 4–0 aggregate. Jankulovski's fourth goal of the season came on 25 January 2004, in a 1–1 draw against Roma. He added two more goals in February, coming against Bologna and Ancona. Jankulovski added two more goals in May and saw the club qualify for UEFA Cup next season. Despite missing two matches during the 2003–04 season, he went on to make 38 appearances and scoring eight times in all competitions.

In the summer of 2004, Jankulovski was linked with a move to Juventus and CSKA Moscow. Eventually, he ended up staying at Udinese, having rejected a move to CSKA Moscow, preferring to join another Serie A club instead. Having missed the opening game of the season, due to injury, Jankulovski made his first appearance of the season, starting the whole game, in a 3–1 loss against Panionios in the first leg of the UEFA Cup first round on 16 September 2004. Three days later on 19 September 2004, he scored his first goal of the season, in a 4–0 loss against Parma. However, a week later against Brescia on 26 September 2004, Jankulovski received a straight red card for unsportsmanlike behaviour in the 80th minute, in a 2–1 loss. Four days later on 30 September 2004, in the return leg against Panionios in the UEFA Cup first round, he received another red card for unsportsmanlike attitude, as the club won 1–0, but was eliminated from the tournament following a 3–2 loss on aggregate. After serving a one match suspension, Jankulovski returned to the starting line-up against Inter Milan on 17 October 2004, as Udinese lost 3–1. Three days later on 20 October 2004, he signed a contract with the club, keeping him until June 2008. Following his return from suspension, Jankulovski regained his first-team place, playing at both right midfield and left midfield. He then scored twice, scoring an equaliser and converting the penalty to score the winning goal of the game, in a 4–3 win against Lecce on 7 November 2004. In a match against AC Milan on 16 January 2005, Jankulovski scored an own goal, in a 3–1 loss. He was able to make amends from mistakes by scoring his fourth goal of the season, in a 3–0 win against Chievo on 2 February 2005. After serving a one-match suspension, Jankulovski returned to the starting line-up against Milan in the second leg of the Coppa Italia quarter-final, and set up one of the goals in a 4–1 win, resulting in Udinese progressing to the semi-final with a 6–4 win on aggregate. Following this, he regained his first team place, starting in the next seven matches for the club. This lasted until when Jankulovski suffered an ankle injury that saw him sidelined for the rest of the 2004–05 season. At the end of the 2004–05 season, he went on to make 37 appearances and scoring four times in all competitions.

AC Milan

In June 2005, Jankulovski was unveiled as an AC Milan player after signing for an undisclosed fee from Udinese. The club has been keen on signing the player since December 2004.

However, he could not start playing immediately, due to a broken ankle sustained two months ago and missed the club's pre–season tour. But Jankulovski recovered and made his Milan debut, coming on as an 87th-minute substitute, in a 1–1 draw against Ascoli in the opening game of the season. Once again, he suffered another injury that saw him out for a month. Jankulovski returned to the first team from injury, coming on as a 78th-minute substitute, in a 2–0 win against Cagliari on 16 October 2005. This was followed up by making his first start for the club and setting up a winning goal for Filippo Inzaghi, in a 2–1 win against Palermo. He made his UEFA Champions League debut, coming on as a second-half substitute, in a 1–0 win against PSV Eindhoven on 1 November 2005. Following his return from injury, Jankulovski found himself in and out of the starting line-up, due to competitions he faced. He scored his first goal for Milan, in a 3–1 win against Messina on 22 April 2006. This was followed up by setting up another goal for Inzaghi, in a 2–0 win against Livorno. At the end of the 2005–06 season, Jankulovski went on to make 28 appearances and scoring once in all competitions.

Ahead of the 2006–07 season, Jankulovski's future at Milan was in doubt, due to his lack of first team opportunities. But he made it clear to stay at the club. Jankulovski started the season well when he helped the club keep six consecutive clean sheets between 13 September 2006 and 1 October 2006.  During which, Jankulovski scored his first goal of the season, scoring the only goal of the game, in a 1–0 win against Ascoli on 20 September 2006. He then scored his second goal of the season, once again, scoring the only goal of the game, in a 1–0 win against Chievo on 25 October 2006. Since the start of the 2006–07 season, Jankulovski quickly established himself at left-back. Upon the arrival of with Massimo Oddo, he became one of Milan's best players, and together, they were relied upon when the club lacked traditional wingers among the attacking players. On 11 February 2007, Jankulovski scored from 25 yards, which turns out to be a winning goal, in a 2–1 win against Livorno. Shortly after, he signed a new contract with Milan, keeping him until 2011. Jankulovski helped the club keep three consecutive clean sheets between 28 April 2007 and 6 May 2007, including a 3–0 win against Manchester United in the second leg of the UEFA Champions League that sent the club into the final. On 23 May 2007, he took part, starting at left-back and contributed to Milan's 2–1 victory in the final of the UEFA Champions League against Liverpool. After the match, Jankulovski said: "I can't even describe how I feel. It's beautiful. You could say it was random, but then we believed we could do it. It helped us, we were ahead of the half and we knew Liverpool had to open the game. This was confirmed and we finally added a second goal. Especially in the first half, they were better. I wasn't in the team at the time, but the memories are still alive. Fortunately, we've done it now." La Repubblica commentened on his performance, saying: "The crooked things of a Milan that travel under the track are all his. Benítez, on the left wing, organized an uncomfortable saucer for him, Pennant going, Mascherano introducing himself and looking for contrast." Despite being sidelined on five occasions throughout the 2006–07 season, Jankulovski made fifty appearances and scoring three times in all competitions.

At the start of the 2007–08 season, Jankulovski started at left-back against Sevilla in the 2007 UEFA Super Cup held on 31 August 2007 and scored the second goal of Milan's victory with a volley following a pass from Andrea Pirlo. He then regained his first-team place, playing at left-back in the first two months to the season. Following a 1–0 loss against Empoli on 21 October 2007, Jankulovski suffered a knee injury and was expected to be out somewhere between two and six months. In early December, he made a recovery from injury and made his return to the first team against Urawa Red Diamonds in the semi-final of the FIFA Club World Cup and helped the club keep a clean sheet to win 1–0 to advance to the final. Despite appearing as an unused substitute, Milan went on to win the tournament after beating Boca Juniors 4–2 on 16 December 2007. However, his return was short-lived when Jankulovski suffered a knee injury that kept him out for two months. He made his return to the first team from injury against Siena on 10 February 2008 and started the whole game to help the club a clean sheet, in a 1–0 win. Following this, Jankulovski continued to be involved in the first team despite suffering further injuries later in the 2007–08 season. At the end of the 2007–08 season, he went on to make nineteen appearances and scoring once in all competitions. Following this, on 28 May 2008, Jankulovski was named the 2007's Czech Player of the Year , with Petr Čech coming in second place.

At the start of the 2008–09 season, Jankulovski regained his first-team place, playing at left-back. He scored his first goal of the season, in a 3–1 win against FC Zürich on 18 September 2008. Three days later on 21 September 2008, Jankulovski set up one of the goals, in a 4–1 win against Lazio. He then helped Milan keep four league consecutive clean sheets between 28 September 2008 and 26 October 2008. Jankulovski then helped the club keep three consecutive clean sheets between 22 March 2009 and 11 April 2009. Despite missing three matches in the 2008–09 season, he went on to make 38 appearances in all competitions, scoring once. Following this, Jankulovski undergo a surgery on his ankle and recovered from his injury.

At the start of the 2009–10 season, Jankulovski became a first-team regular for Milan, starting at left-back in the team's first six matches of the season. However, he was dropped from the first team and was demoted to the substitute bench, as Luca Antonini took over the left-back position. However, Jankulovski suffered ankle injury that saw him out for the rest of the year. It wasn't until on 6 January 2010 when he made his return to the first team, coming on as a 76th-minute substitute, in a 5–2 win against Genoa. Due to lack of first team opportunities, Milan were said to have offered Jankulovski to Inter in exchange for Mancini during the winter transfer period. However, he refused to move to the club's bitter rivals and later said that betraying Milan was not an option, stating, "Truth be told, I didn't give it much thought... I wanted to stay at Milan, I've been here for five years and I'm settled." Following this, he later made five starts later in the 2009–10 season. Despite facing further sidelined later in the 2009–10 season, Jankulovski went on to make sixteen appearances in all competitions.

Ahead of the 2010–11 season, Jankulovski said he wanted to stay at Milan despite expecting to be behind the pecking order. Jankulovski continued to remain on the sidelines for the first four months of the season due to injuries and Antonini remained as the club's first-choice left-back. He made his first appearance of the season, coming on as a late substitute, in a 3–1 win against Palermo on 10 November 2010. However, his return was short-lived when Jankulovski suffered another injury that kept him out for two months. It was not until 26 January 2011 when he made his first appearances in two months, coming on as an 80th-minute substitute in a 2–1 win against Sampdoria in the quarter-final of the Coppa Italia. Four days later on 30 January 2011, Jankulovski announced his intention to leave Milan at the end of the 2010–11 season and return to the Czech Republic to close out his career. Following the absence of Antonini, Jankulovski made three starts for the club, playing at left-back. In a match against Palermo on 17 March 2011, however, Jankulovski suffered a knee injury and was substituted in the 17th minute, as Milan lost 1–0. After the match, he had surgery on his knee, causing him to miss the rest of the 2010–11 season. Despite this, Jankulovski part of the Milan team that won the Serie A title for the first time since the 2003–04 season. At the end of the 2010–11 season, he went on to make eight appearances in all competitions.

Return to Baník Ostrava

On 10 October 2011, Jankulovski returned to play club football in the Czech Republic for the first time since leaving Baník Ostrava for Italy 11 years before. He stated on four separate interviews about returning to his hometown club one day.

He made his first appearance in eleven years against Hradec Králové on 15 October 2011 but managed to play just eight minutes after coming on as a substitute before suffering a knee injury and leaving the pitch, in what turned out to be his last professional football match. On 20 February 2012, Jankulovski announced his retirement due to not being able to recover from his knee injury. A year later, he was given a farewell match, arranged by the club, and participated in the match.

International career
Jankulovski represented Czech Republic from the U16 to the U21 side. On 8 February 2000, he made his senior team debut, starting the whole game, in a 2–1 win against Mexico. In June 2000, Jankulovski was named in the squad fpr UEFA Euro 2000. He made his debut in the tournament against France on 16 June 2000, coming on as a 62nd-minute substitute for Tomáš Rosický, in a 2–1 loss, resulting in Czech Republic eliminated from the tournament. Jankulovski made another appearance in the tournament against Denmark on 20 June 2000, coming on as a 61st-minute substitute, in a 2–0 win.

Following the end of the UEFA Euro 2000 tournament, Jankulovski made his first start for the national team, in a 1–0 loss against Slovenia on 16 August 2000. A month later, he was called up to the Czech Republic Olympics squad in the 2000 Summer Olympics. Jankulovski scored in the tournament, in a 2–2 draw against the United States on 13 September 2000. He played two more times in the tournament, as Czech Republic were eliminated from the group stage. It wasn't until on 1 September 2001 when Jankulovski scored his first goal for the national side, in a 3–1 loss against Iceland. This was followed up by scoring his second goal for Czech Republic, in a 3–2 win against Malta. He then played in both legs of play–offs against Belgium, as the national side lost 2–0 on aggragate.

Following the failure to qualify for the 2002 FIFA World Cup, Jankulovski helped Czech Republic keep three consecutive clean sheets between 27 March and 18 May 2002. He then scored his third goal for Czech Republic, in a 2–0 win against Moldova on 12 October 2002. Jankulovski then scored his fourth goal for the national side, in a 4–0 win against Austria on 2 April 2003. In June 2004, he was called up to the squad for UEFA Euro 2004. Jankulovski became the Czech Republic's first-choice left-back and helped the national team progress through the group stage and the quarter-final. However, he helped Czech Republic finish third place in the tournament after losing 1–0 against Greece on 1 July 2004.

Following the end of the UEFA Euro tournament, Jankulovski helped the national side keep four consecutive clean sheets between 9 October 2004 and 5 February 2005. A month later on 30 March 2005, he scored his seventh goal for Czech Republic, in a 4–0 win against Andorra. Jankulovski then played against Norway in both legs of play–offs, as the national side won 2–0 to qualify for the FIFA World Cup. In May 2006, he was named in the Czech Republic squad for the 2006 FIFA World Cup. Jankulovski then helped the national team keep four consecutive clean sheets between 26 May 2006 and 12 June 2006, including scoring once against Saudi Arabia and then in the opening match of the group stage against the United States. Jankulovski became the Czech Republic's first-choice left-back in the next two matches, as the team was eliminated in the group stage.

Following the end of the World Cup, Jankulovski continued to be the Czech Republic's first-choice left-back throughout UEFA Euro 2008 qualifying. He then scored two goals in two matches between 8 September 2007 and 12 September 2007 against San Marino and Republic of Ireland. Czech Republic went on to qualify for the UEFA Euro 2008 after beating Germany on 17 October 2007. On 14 May 2008, it was announced that Jakulovski would be included in the Czech Republic squad for UEFA Euro 2008. He was the team's first-choice left-back throughout the tournament and played all three matches, as the Czech Republic were eliminated in the group stage.

Having previously hinted about ending his international career after UEFA Euro 2008, Jakulovski had a change of heart on retirement. He was called up to the national team on 11 August 2008. Jakulovski scored his twelfth goal for Czech Republic in a 2–2 draw against England nine days later on 20 August. He then continued to be the team's first-choice left-back for the next two years. Jakulovski scored his third goal for Czech Republic, in a 2–1 loss against Slovakia on 1 April 2009. However, the national team failed to qualify for FIFA World Cup and he announced his retirement from international football shortly after. He earned 77 caps for the Czech Republic, scoring 12 goals during a nine-year international career.

Post playing career

Shortly after announcing his retirement from professional football, Baník Ostrava said they appointed Jankulovski as their consultant. He also worked as a pundit for the UEFA Champions League coverage.

Having expressed interest in working for Baník Ostrava, Jankulovski was appointed as the club's sporting director on 18 June 2018. After two seasons at Baník Ostrava, he left his role as the club's sporting director on 13 July 2020.

Personal life
His father, Pando Jankulovski, is a Macedonian who emigrated to Czechoslovakia from Yugoslavia, while mother is Czech. In addition to speaking Czech, Jankulovski speaks Italian. He is married to Jana Jankulovska and they have two daughters, Karolína and Kristýna.

In May 2006, Jankulovski was accused of placing bets through an illegal bookmaker, along with three other players; which Betting was not illegal for Italian players until November 2005. The investigation lasted until June 2007 when he was cleared of all charges facing against him. In May 2009, Jankulovski was accused of placing bets through an illegal bookmaker, along with three other players once again. The investigation lasted until July 2010 when he was cleared of all charges facing against him. In January 2016, Jankulovski was named as one of 
several players accused of tax evasion.

Career statistics

Club
Source:

International
Appearances and goals by national team and year

Honours
AC Milan
Serie A: 2010–11
UEFA Champions League: 2006–07
UEFA Super Cup: 2007
FIFA Club World Cup: 2007

Individual
Czech Footballer of the Year: 2007

References

External links

 
 
 

1977 births
Living people
Sportspeople from Ostrava
Czech footballers
Association football defenders
FC Baník Ostrava players
S.S.C. Napoli players
Udinese Calcio players
A.C. Milan players
Czech First League players
Serie A players
Serie B players
UEFA Champions League winning players
Czech Republic youth international footballers
Czech Republic under-21 international footballers
Czech Republic international footballers
UEFA Euro 2000 players
UEFA Euro 2004 players
2006 FIFA World Cup players
UEFA Euro 2008 players
Olympic footballers of the Czech Republic
Footballers at the 2000 Summer Olympics
Czech expatriate footballers
Expatriate footballers in Italy
Czech expatriate sportspeople in Italy
Czech people of Macedonian descent